Frank Fellows (November 7, 1889 – August 27, 1951) was a U.S. Representative from Maine serving from 1941 until his death in Bangor, Maine in 1951.

Born in Bucksport, Maine, Fellows attended the public schools, East Maine Conference Seminary in Bucksport, Maine, and the University of Maine. He was graduated from the University of Maine Law School, admitted to the bar in 1911, and commenced practice in Portland, Maine. He served as clerk of the United States District Court of Maine 1917-1920. He later moved his practice to Bangor, Maine.

Fellows was elected as a Republican to the Seventy-seventh Congress and to the five succeeding Congresses and served from January 3, 1941, until his death in Bangor, August 27, 1951.  He represented Bangor and Eastern Maine in the 3rd Congressional District, taking the seat of his political mentor, Owen Brewster, who had successfully run for the United States Senate. Fellows began to make a national name for himself in 1948 with 'red-baiting' speeches, such as one in Baltimore in which he said "we need to spray and fumigate the State Dept. with DDT of 100% strength". On the other hand, as Chairman of the House Sub-Committee on Immigration, he also sponsored a House bill to admit over 200,000 "displaced persons" (European war refugees) into the United States, and fought as " discriminatory" the Senate version of the same legislation which would have barred Jews and created preferences for northern Europeans. Even the Fellows Bill, however, left out Asians, and set a total quota only half as large as the one requested by President Truman.

Fellows died in office after an illness. He is interred in Silver Lake Cemetery, Bucksport, Maine.

See also
 List of United States Congress members who died in office (1950–99)

References

External links

Frank Fellows, Late a Representative.  1952.  U.S. Government Printing Office.

Politicians from Bangor, Maine
People from Bucksport, Maine
1889 births
1951 deaths
University of Maine School of Law alumni
Republican Party members of the United States House of Representatives from Maine
20th-century American politicians
East Maine Conference Seminary alumni